Anani is both a surname and a given name. Notable people with the name include:

Surname
Achille Anani (born 1994), Ivorian professional footballer
Hamza Anani (born 1988), Algerian professional footballer
Jawad Anani (born 1943), Jordanian economist and politician
Mohsen Mohamed Anani (born 1985), Egyptian hammer thrower
Nabil Anani (born 1943), Palestinian artist
Sumya Anani (born 1972), retired American professional female boxer
Zachariah Anani, former Sunni Muslim Lebanese who converted to Christianity and settled in Canada

Given name
Francis Anani Kofi Lodonu (born 1937), Ghanaian Roman Catholic bishop
Anani Mikhaylov (born 1948), Bulgarian fencer
Anani Mohamed (born 1992), American-Guyanese professional soccer player
Anani ben Sason, Jewish Talmudist who lived in the Land of Israel, an amora of the third century
Anani Yavashev (born 1932), Bulgarian actor

See also
Anaeini, a tribe of butterflies
Anagni, an ancient town in Italy
Anania, a genus of moths
Ananiah, a town in the Bible
Ananias (disambiguation)
Ananiel, a character in the Book of Enoch
Ananius (fl. c. 540 BCE), a Greek poet
Hanani, the name of four men mentioned in the Bible
Wanani, a town in the Comoros